Disobedience is a 2017 romantic drama film directed by Sebastián Lelio and written by Lelio and Rebecca Lenkiewicz, based on the 2006 novel of the same name by Naomi Alderman. The film stars Rachel Weisz, Rachel McAdams, and Alessandro Nivola. Set in North London, it tells the story of a woman who returns to the strict Orthodox Jewish community for her father's funeral after living in New York for many years, having been estranged from her father and ostracised by the community for a reason that becomes clearer as the story unfolds. The film was produced by Weisz, Ed Guiney, and Frida Torresblanco.

Disobedience had its world premiere at the Toronto International Film Festival on 10 September 2017. It was released in the United States on 27 April 2018, by Bleecker Street and in the United Kingdom and Ireland on 30 November 2018, by Curzon Artificial Eye.

The film received some positive reviews, with critics praising the performances of Weisz, McAdams, and Nivola, Lelio's direction, and the screenplay. It was nominated for the British Independent Film Awards, GLAAD Media Awards, and Dorian Awards for Best Picture.

United Kingdom rating company British Board of Film Classification has rated the movie 15 (for strong sex).

Plot
 

The old Rav Krushka succumbs to illness while delivering a sermon on free will to his Orthodox Jewish congregation in North London. Ronit, the Rav's estranged daughter who lives and works in New York City as a photographer, returns to London.

Ronit arrives at the home of her childhood friend, Dovid Kuperman, a chosen disciple of her father, as members of her father's congregation pay their respects to the deceased. Ronit fails to fit in, behaving in a manner not conforming to Orthodox culture. Despite his surprise at Ronit's visit, Dovid insists she stay with him. Ronit is surprised to discover that Esti, a childhood friend to both of them, is now Dovid's wife.

Ronit and her two friends attend Shabbat dinner at Ronit's uncle's house. Ronit tries to ask her uncle about selling the house, but he says they cannot discuss business on the Sabbath. Ronit is questioned by the other party guests about changing her name and is told to take her mother's candlesticks so she may one day give them to her children. One of the guests tells Ronit that she should get married because it is what should be done. Ronit says that if she had stayed, she probably would have been married off, but she would have been suicidal. She leaves to walk home, joined by Dovid and Esti, and talk about her father.

Ronit visits her uncle Moshe at his office to discuss the disposition of her father's house but discovers her father has left all of his possessions to the synagogue and is only allowed inside to retrieve personal items. Esti accompanies her, and after they reminisce about their memories of the Rav's house, Esti tenderly kisses Ronit, who initially resists before reciprocating. Esti confesses to having asked Ronit to be notified of her father's death out of a desire to see her again.

Esti reveals her unhappiness with her life choices, taken based on the Rav's advice and her strong belief in HaShem. After being caught in a romantic tryst resulting in Ronit's departure from the community, neither Ronit nor Esti have been with other women. While Ronit is bisexual, Esti admits that she is a lesbian. On the way home, they stop at a nearby park and kiss in an empty tennis court, but are spotted by a couple from the congregation. Esti walks away unseen, but the couple identify Ronit and suspect that the other woman was Esti, despite Ronit's unconvincing denial.

The next day, Esti, who works as a teacher at the local Jewish school, is called into the headmistress' office after the couple deliver a complaint about Esti and Ronit's behaviour. At the synagogue, Dovid is asked to take over the Rav's duties. He is warned about Ronit but insists that he keeps his house in order. Meanwhile, Ronit tells a shaken Esti that she is leaving the next day, without attending her father's hesped. The two of them sneak away to a hotel room in central London for passionate sex. After, Esti tells Ronit that she thought of her often, imagining her New York apartment and keeping track of the time difference. Esti brings up the memory of the Rav walking in on them when they were young girls. Ronit says she regrets never taking his portrait. Ronit then tells Esti that she wants to take her picture. Esti is initially shy but poses with Ronit's cigarette.

Esti arrives home late and turns down Dovid when he tries to initiate intimacy. The next morning Esti feels sick. Later that morning Dovid informs Esti that Mrs Shapiro had made a formal complaint, and he asks her to tell him the truth. Esti confesses that she kissed Ronit and expresses her feelings, but Dovid tells her that Ronit is taking advantage of her. Esti denies this and says that she wanted this to happen, causing Dovid to leave. Ronit, who overhears the argument, suggests that Esti should leave Dovid.

Dovid attends to his duties at the synagogue, clearly preoccupied. At dinner that night, Ronit announces that she has booked a flight and is leaving that night without attending the hesped, to Esti's dismay. That night, after Dovid falls asleep, Esti goes to a drugstore and purchases a pregnancy test. Later in a hotel room, she begins Shuckling against a cabinet and crying.

The next morning, Ronit is about to board her flight when Dovid calls her and reports that Esti is missing. Ronit and Dovid spend the day looking for Esti. They return to his home at night to find Esti already there. She reveals that she is pregnant but asks for her freedom from Dovid by stating she wants to give her unborn child a chance to decide whether or not to be part of their community. Dovid leaves, upset.

Ronit and Esti attend the Rav's hesped, which is to be given by Dovid in front of the entire congregation. After the opening Zemirot, Ronit invites Esti to come live with her in New York. Dovid begins to speak but is unable to follow his prepared text. Instead, he reminds the congregation of the sermon that the Rav was delivering right before he died on the freedom to choose. Under the guise of addressing the congregation, he releases Esti from their marriage and then publicly turns down the offer of becoming the congregation's new spiritual guide. Esti finds him outside and they embrace. Dovid motions for Ronit to join in their embrace, finally reconciling their old friendship.

The next morning, Ronit departs for New York, cordially bidding Dovid and Esti goodbye. As Ronit's cab is driving away, Esti chases after Ronit and gives her a final kiss, and they confess their love for each other. Ronit tells Esti that she will be a brilliant mother, and they promise to keep in touch. Ronit makes a detour to her father's grave to bid him a final goodbye and take a picture of his grave.

Cast

Production

Development
On 29 September 2016, it was reported that Rachel Weisz was set to produce and star in an adaptation of the Naomi Alderman novel Disobedience; with Ed Guiney and Frida Torresblanco as co-producers, and Sebastián Lelio directing from a script by Lelio and Rebecca Lenkiewicz. On 4 October 2016, Rachel McAdams joined the cast, followed by Alessandro Nivola as McAdams's husband on 7 December 2016. The film was co-financed by Film4 Productions and FilmNation Entertainment. Matthew Herbert joined the production to compose the film score.

Filming
Principal photography on the Irish-British-American production began on 3 January 2017.
Filming locations in London included Golders Green, Cricklewood and Hendon.

Release
In May 2017, Curzon Artificial Eye acquired U.K. distribution rights from FilmNation Entertainment, and international distribution rights were acquired by Roadshow (Australia), Mars Films (France), Cinema SRL (Italy), Lev Films (Israel), Pathé (Switzerland), and Sony Pictures Worldwide Acquisitions for various territories. Bleecker Street acquired the U.S. distribution rights in September 2017, and Mongrel Media acquired the rights for Canada.

Disobedience had its world premiere at the Toronto International Film Festival on 10 September 2017. The film premiered in the United States at the Tribeca Film Festival in the Spotlight Narrative section on 24 April 2018. The film was released theatrically in the U.S. as a limited release on 27 April 2018, in Australia on 14 June and on 30 November in the United Kingdom.

The United Kingdom rating company British Board of Film Classification has rated the movie 15 (for strong sex).
By contrast the German rating company FSK has rated the movie FSK 0 (released without age restriction).

Reception

Box office
Disobedience grossed $3.5 million in the United States and Canada, and $4.5 million in other territories, for a worldwide total of $8.0 million.

The film debuted in five cinemas in New York City and Los Angeles and made $241,276 in its opening weekend (a per-venue average of $48k), ranking as the fourth-best opening average for the year to that point, after Isle Of Dogs ($60k), Avengers: Infinity War ($55k) and Black Panther ($50k).

Critical response
On review aggregator website Rotten Tomatoes, the film holds an approval rating of 84% based on 209 reviews, and an average rating of 7.20/10. The website's critical consensus states, "Disobedience explores a variety of thought-provoking themes, bolstered by gripping work from leads Rachel Weisz, Rachel McAdams, and Alessandro Nivola." On Metacritic, the film has a weighted average score of 74 out of 100, based on 38 critics, indicating "generally favorable reviews".

Andrew Barker of Variety gave the film a positive review, writing that Disobedience "may not catapult Lelio beyond the arthouse world, but it's yet another triumph in what's shaping up to be a major career." David Rooney of The Hollywood Reporter also gave the film a positive review writing, "Beautifully acted by Rachel Weisz, Rachel McAdams and Alessandro Nivola as the three points of a melancholy romantic triangle, this is a deeply felt drama that exerts a powerful grip."

Writing for Rolling Stone, Peter Travers gave the film 3.5 stars out of 4, describing it as "a gorgeously acted, written and directed spellbinder...that never preaches or judges. Without dialogue, Lelio creates a whole world that can be read eloquently and movingly on the faces of two superb actresses who give unstintingly to its creation."

David Ehrlich from IndieWire praised the importance of the subject, the outstanding acting and good direction, saying: "A fraught and emotionally nuanced love story about the tension between the life we’re born into and the one we want for ourselves...Both Weisz and McAdams do a phenomenal job of negotiating who their characters are versus who their characters feel as though they have to be...Lelio builds to a beautiful and powerfully ambiguous moment that brings all the major characters together."

Peter Bradshaw from The Guardian praised the performances, direction, and score  saying, "Rachel Weisz, Rachel McAdams and Alessandro Nivola are at the top of their game...The drama is expertly controlled by Lelio, lit and shot in muted and subdued colour tones by cinematographer Danny Cohen and it has a very interesting musical score by Matthew Herbert...This is richly satisfying and powerfully acted work."

Accolades

See also 
 The Secrets (film)
 Red Cow (film)
 Eyes Wide Open (film)

References

External links
 
 
 Disobedience at British Council Film
 
 
 Disobedience Press Kit from Mongrel Media

2017 films
2017 independent films
2017 LGBT-related films
2017 romantic drama films
American independent films
American LGBT-related films
American romantic drama films
Anti-Orthodox Judaism sentiment
Bisexuality-related films
British independent films
British LGBT-related films
British romantic drama films
English-language Irish films
Female bisexuality in film
Film4 Productions films
FilmNation Entertainment films
Films about LGBT and Judaism
Films about Orthodox and Hasidic Jews
Films based on British novels
Films critical of Judaism and Jews
Films directed by Sebastián Lelio
Films scored by Matthew Herbert
Films set in London
Films shot in London
Irish independent films
Irish LGBT-related films
Irish romantic drama films
Lesbian-related films
Films about anti-LGBT sentiment
LGBT-related romantic drama films
2010s English-language films
2010s American films
2010s British films